Shirley Anne Hodges (born 27 June 1943) is an English former cricketer who played as a wicket-keeper. She appeared in 11 Test matches and 26 One Day Internationals for England between 1969 and 1982. Her final WODI appearance was in the final of the 1982 Women's Cricket World Cup.

She played domestic cricket for Sussex.
She also taught PE at Mountfield Road Secondary School in Lewes and at Hastings High School for Girls, Hastings.

References

External links
 

1943 births
Living people
People from Battersea
England women Test cricketers
England women One Day International cricketers
Sussex women cricketers
Wicket-keepers